Drymocallis rupestris, the rock cinquefoil, is a small plant of Eurasia.

References

External links

rupestris